The New York City Police Department Housing Bureau is responsible for providing the security and delivery of police services to about 420,000 people living in New York City's public housing projects. They are stationed in Police Service Areas (PSA), which are almost identical to police precincts, with nine PSAs in total located throughout Manhattan, Brooklyn, Queens, and The Bronx.

Officers often conduct interior patrols, making sure illegal activity does not take place in the halls, stairways, or the rooftops. The New York City Housing Authority Police Department was merged with the NYPD, like the New York City Transit Police, in 1995. Similar to police precincts, new police officers who graduate from the police academy are assigned to housing units. Statistics on crimes in NYC Public Housing are posted by the NYPD and are available on-line at:

Housing Commands

Brooklyn borough 
 Police Service Area 1 – Patrols Housing developments in the confines of the 60th, 61st, 63rd, 69th, 76th and 78th precincts in Brooklyn South
 Police Service Area 2 – Patrols Housing developments in the confines of the 73rd, 75th and 77th precincts in Brooklyn North
 Police Service Area 3 – Patrols Housing developments in the confines of the 79th, 84th, 81st, 88th and 90th precincts in Brooklyn North

Manhattan borough 
 Police Service Area 4 – Patrols Housing developments in the confines of the 5th, 7th, 9th and 10th precincts in Manhattan South
 Police Service Area 5 – Patrols Housing developments in the confines of the 23rd, 25th and 28th precincts in Manhattan North
 Police Service Area 6 – Patrols Housing developments in the confines of the 24th, 26th and 32nd precincts in Manhattan North

Bronx/Queens borough 
 Police Service Area 7 – Patrols Housing developments in the confines of the 40th and 42nd precincts in the Bronx
 Police Service Area 8 – Patrols Housing developments in the confines of the 43rd, 45th and 47th precincts in the Bronx
 Police Service Area 9 – Patrols Housing developments in the confines of the 114th and 107th precincts in Queens

See also 

 New York City Police Department
 New York City Housing Authority Police Department

References

Reference #1 is also a

External links 
 Housing Bureau homepage at the NYPD site

Public housing in the United States
Housing Bureau